The Litter Act 1979 was an act passed by the Western Australian Government to prevent littering. It helped to set up the Keep Australia Beautiful Council (W.A.).

See also
Litter in Australia

References

Law of Australia
Australian Public Service
Government of Western Australia